The 1987–88 Courage Cornwall/Devon League was the first full season of rugby union within the eighth tier of the English league system currently known as Tribute Cornwall/Devon. The league consisted of eleven teams; six from Devon and five from Cornwall. Each team played one match against each of the other teams, playing a total of ten matches with five at home and five away. Both Crediton and Exmouth won nine of their ten matches, with Crediton declared champions because of their superior points difference, and winning promotion to the Western Counties league for season 1988–89. Newton Abbot, lost all ten matches and were relegated to Devon One while St Austell, with one win and a draw, were relegated to Cornwall One.

Participating teams and locations

League table

Sponsorship
The Cornwall/Devon League was part of the Courage Clubs Championship and was sponsored by Courage Brewery.

See also

 English rugby union system
 Rugby union in Cornwall

References

Cornwall1
Tribute Cornwall/Devon